
This is a list of species in the fungal genus Pholiota. , Index Fungorum accepts 370 species in Pholiota.

A B C D E F G H I J K L M N O P Q R S T U V U W X Y Z

A

Pholiota aberrans A.H.Sm. & Hesler 1968 – United States
Pholiota abieticola A.H.Sm. & Hesler 1968 – United States
Pholiota abietis A.H.Sm. & Hesler 1968 – United States
Pholiota abstrusa (Fr.) Singer 1951
Pholiota acutoconica A.H.Sm. & Hesler 1968 – United States
Pholiota adiposa (Batsch) P.Kumm. 1871 – Czech Republic; Great Britain
Pholiota adirondackensis A.H.Sm. & Hesler 1968 – United States
Pholiota aggericola (Peck) Sacc. 1887
Pholiota agglutinata A.H.Sm. & Hesler 1968 – United States
Pholiota aggregata Beeli 1928 – Congo
Pholiota agrocybiformis Singer 1969
Pholiota alabamensis (Murrill) A.H.Sm. & Hesler 1968 – United States
Pholiota alachuana Murrill 1943 – United States
Pholiota albo-olivasens A.H.Sm. & Hesler 1968 – United States
Pholiota albovirescens A.H.Sm. & Hesler 1968 – United States
Pholiota alexandrina Reichert 1921
Pholiota alnea Singer 1952 – Great Britain
Pholiota alnicola (Fr.) Singer 1951 – Czech Republic; Great Britain; Northern Ireland
Pholiota alniphila (Zeller) Redhead 1984
Pholiota angustifolia A.H.Sm. & Hesler 1968 – United States
Pholiota angustipes (Peck) Sacc. 1887
Pholiota anomala Peck 1895
Pholiota apiahyna  Speg. 1919
Pholiota appendiculata Peck 1905
Pholiota arenariobulbosa (Cleland) Grgur. 1997
Pholiota armeniaca A.H.Sm. & Hesler 1968 – United States
Pholiota arragonis Rick 1930
Pholiota aschersoniana Henn. & Ruhland 1901
Pholiota ascophora (Peck) Singer 1969
Pholiota astragalina (Fr.) Singer 1951 – Czech Republic; Great Britain; Norway; Switzerland
Pholiota atripes A.H.Sm. & Hesler 1968 – United States
Pholiota aurantiaca Thesleff 1920
Pholiota aurantioalbida Singer 1969
Pholiota aurantioflava A.H.Sm. & Hesler 1968 – United States
Pholiota aurivella (Batsch) P.Kumm. 1871 – Czech Republic; Great Britain; Tasmania
Pholiota aurivelloides Overh. 1927
Pholiota austrospumosa Hongo 1977
Pholiota autumnalis Peck 1908
Pholiota avellaneifolia A.H.Sm. & Hesler 1968 – United States

B

Pholiota baeosperma Singer 1953
Pholiota bakerensis A.H.Sm. & Hesler 1968 – United States
Pholiota bambusina K.A.Thomas & Manim. 2001
Pholiota baptisiae A.H.Sm. & Hesler 1968 – United States
Pholiota barrowsii A.H.Sm. & Hesler 1968 – United States
Pholiota basilei Mattir. 1932
Pholiota bicincta (Kalchbr.) McAlpine 1895
Pholiota bicolor (Speg.) Singer 1951
Pholiota bigelowii A.H.Sm. & Hesler 1968 – United States
Pholiota blechni Singer 1965
Pholiota brevipes Z.S.Bi 1989
Pholiota bridgei A.H.Sm. & Hesler 1968 – United States
Pholiota brunnea A.H.Sm. & Hesler 1968 – United States
Pholiota brunneoatra Rick 1930
Pholiota brunneodisca (Peck) A.H.Sm. & Hesler 1968 – United States
Pholiota brunnescens A.H.Sm. & Hesler 1968 – United States – Great Britain
Pholiota burkei A.H.Sm. & Hesler 1968 – United States

C

Pholiota caespitosa A.H.Sm. & Hesler 1968 – United States
Pholiota calendulina Singer 1952 – Argentina
Pholiota californica (Earle) A.H.Sm. & Hesler 1968 – United States
Pholiota calvinii A.H.Sm. & Hesler 1968 – United States
Pholiota canescens A.H.Sm. & Hesler 1968 – United States
Pholiota capocystidia J.Bao Wang 1992
Pholiota carbonaria A.H.Sm. 1944 – Great Britain; Victoria
Pholiota carbonicola Singer 1962
Pholiota carneola Rick 1930
Pholiota castanea A.H.Sm. & Hesler 1968 – United States
Pholiota catervaria (Lév.) Manjula 1983
Pholiota cerasina Peck 1908
Pholiota chacoensis Speg. 1926
Pholiota chromocystis A.H.Sm. & Hesler 1968 – United States
Pholiota chrysmoides Soop 2001 – New Zealand
Pholiota chrysocystidiata Singer 1986
Pholiota cinchonensis Murrill 1913
Pholiota cincta (Cleland) Grgur. 1997
Pholiota citrinofolia Métrod 1962
Pholiota coloradensis A.H.Sm. & Hesler 1968 – United States
Pholiota communis (Cleland & Cheel) Grgur. 1997 – Victoria
Pholiota condensa (Peck) A.H.Sm. & Hesler 1968 – United States
Pholiota conica A.H.Sm. & Hesler 1968 – United States
Pholiota conissans (Fr.) M.M.Moser 1986 – France; Great Britain; Italy; Ontario
Pholiota connata A.H.Sm. & Hesler 1968 – United States
Pholiota contorta A.H.Sm. & Hesler 1968 – United States
Pholiota corticola (Murrill) A.H.Sm. & Hesler 1968 – United States
Pholiota cortinata (DC.) Singer 1989
Pholiota crassipedes A.H.Sm. & Hesler 1968 – United States
Pholiota crassivela (Speg.) Speg. 1887
Pholiota cubensis Earle 1906 – São Paulo
Pholiota curcuma (Berk. & M.A. Curtis) A.H.Sm. & Hesler 1968 – United States
Pholiota cyathicola (Murrill) A.H.Sm. & Hesler 1968 – United States
Pholiota cystidiata Natarajan & C. Ravindran 2003 – India

D
Pholiota davidsonii A.H.Sm. & Hesler 1968 – United States
Pholiota deceptiva A.H.Sm. & Hesler 1968 – United States
Pholiota decorata (Murrill) A.H.Sm. & Hesler 1968 – United States
Pholiota decurrens Velen. 1921
Pholiota decussata (Fr.) M.M.Moser 1967 – Great Britain
Pholiota depauperata (Singer & A.H.Sm.) A.H.Sm. & Hesler 1968 – United States
Pholiota destruens Gillet (edible)
Pholiota dinghuensis Z.S.Bi 1985
Pholiota disrupta (Cooke & Massee) McAlpine 1895
Pholiota drummondii (Berk.) Pegler 1965
Pholiota duroides Peck 1908

E
Pholiota ealaensis Beeli 1928 – Congo
Pholiota elegans Jacobsson 1991 – Czech Republic; Sweden
Pholiota engleriana Henn. 1893
Pholiota eucalyptorum (Cleland) Singer 1952

F

Pholiota fallax Velen. 1921
Pholiota ferruginea A.H.Sm. & Hesler 1968 – United States
Pholiota ferrugineolutescens A.H.Sm. & Hesler 1968 – United States
Pholiota fibrillosipes (Murrill) A.H.Sm. & Hesler 1968 – United States
Pholiota fieldiana Y.S.Chang & A.K.Mills 2006 – Australia
Pholiota flammans (Batsch) P.Kumm. 1871 – Germany; Great Britain; Northern Ireland; Switzerland
Pholiota flavescens A.H.Sm. & Hesler 1968 – United States
Pholiota flavida (Schaeff.) Singer 1951
Pholiota flavopallida A.H.Sm. & Hesler 1968 – United States
Pholiota floridana Murrill 1943
Pholiota foedata (Peck) A.H.Sm. & Hesler 1968 – United States
Pholiota foetans Bat. & A.F.Vital 1955
Pholiota formosa Speg. 1926
Pholiota fragilissima Rick 1926
Pholiota freindlingiae (Singer) Singer 1951
Pholiota frusticola (Berk.) Pegler 1965
Pholiota fulvella (Peck) A.H.Sm. & Hesler 1968 – United States
Pholiota fulviconica (Murrill) A.H.Sm. & Hesler 1968 – United States
Pholiota fulvodisca A.H.Sm. & Hesler 1968 – United States
Pholiota fulvosquamosa Peck 1903
Pholiota fulvozonata A.H.Sm. & Hesler 1968 – United States
Pholiota furcata Overh. 1924

G

Pholiota galapagensis Pegler 1981 – Galapagos Islands
Pholiota galerinoides A.H.Sm. & Hesler 1968 – United States
Pholiota gigantea Naveau 1923
Pholiota glaucellae Vouaux 1914
Pholiota glutinigera Singer 1960
Pholiota glutinosa (Massee) E.Horak 1971
Pholiota glutinosipes Singer 1961
Pholiota gollani Henn. 1901
Pholiota goossensiae Beeli 1928 – Congo
Pholiota graminum Cleland 1933 – Australia
Pholiota granulosa (Peck) A.H.Sm. & Hesler 1968 – United States
Pholiota granulosoverrucosa Henn. 1901
Pholiota graveolens (Peck) A.H.Sm. & Hesler 1968 – United States
Pholiota gregariiformis (Murrill) A.H.Sm. & Hesler 1968 – United States
Pholiota gruberi A.H.Sm. & Hesler 1968 – United States
Pholiota gummosa (Lasch) Singer 1951 – Great Britain; Northern Ireland; Portugal; Switzerland
Pholiota gymnopiloides Raithelh. 1974
Pholiota gymnopodia (Bull.) A.F.M.Reijnders 1998

H

Pholiota harenosa A.H.Sm. & Hesler 1968 – United States
Pholiota heliocaes (Berk. & Broome) Singer 1955
Pholiota henningsii (Bres.) P.D.Orton 1960
Pholiota hepatica Massee 1914
Pholiota hiemalis A.H.Sm. & Hesler 1968 – United States
Pholiota highlandensis (Peck) Quadr. & Lunghini 1990 – Channel Is.; France; Great Britain; Italy; Victoria; Western Australia
Pholiota humidicola (Murrill) A.H.Sm. & Hesler 1968 – United States
Pholiota humii A.H.Sm. & Hesler 1968 – United States
Pholiota hymaeneicola Beeli 1928 – Congo
Pholiota hypholomoides (Murrill) A.H.Sm. & Hesler 1968 – United States

I

Pholiota imperfecta Cleland 1933 – Australia
Pholiota impudica Speg. 1889
Pholiota indecens (Peck) Sacc. 1887
Pholiota indica Massee 1901
Pholiota innocua A.H.Sm. & Hesler 1968 – United States
Pholiota irazuensis Singer 1989
Pholiota iterata A.H.Sm. & Hesler 1968 – United States

J

Pholiota jahnii Tjall.-Beuk. & Bas 1986 – Great Britain
Pholiota jalapensis (Murrill) A.H.Sm. & Hesler 1968 – United States
Pholiota johnsoniana (Peck) G.F.Atk. 1918

K
Pholiota kalmicola (Murrill) A.H.Sm. & Hesler 1968 – United States
Pholiota kauffmaniana A.H.Sm. 1944
Pholiota kodiakensis A.H.Sm. & Hesler 1968 – United States
Pholiota kubickae Singer & Clémençon 1971
Pholiota kummeriana Henn. 1900 – Africa

L

Pholiota lactea A.H.Sm. & Hesler 1968 – United States
Pholiota lanaripes Rick 1961
Pholiota langei Singer 1945
Pholiota lapponica (Fr.) Singer 1951
Pholiota lenta (Pers.) Singer 1951 – Czech Republic; Great Britain; Italy; Spain
Pholiota leptographa Sacc. 1914
Pholiota leptopoda Speg. 1889
Pholiota limonella (Peck) Sacc. 1887 – Czech Republic; Great Britain
Pholiota linicola Bubák 1914
Pholiota livistonae  S.Ito & S.Imai 1940 – Japan
Pholiota lubrica  (Pers.) Singer 1951 – Great Britain
Pholiota lucifera  (Lasch) Quél. 1872 – Czech Republic; Great Britain
Pholiota lundbergii Jacobsson 1997
Pholiota lurida A.H.Sm. & Hesler 1968 – United States
Pholiota lutaria  (Maire) Kuyper & Tjall.-Beuk. 1986
Pholiota luteobadia A.H.Sm. & Hesler 1968 – United States
Pholiota luteola A.H.Sm. & Hesler 1968 – United States
Pholiota lutescens A.H.Sm. & Hesler 1968 – United States

M

Pholiota maackiae Singer 1948
Pholiota macmurphyi Murrill 1912
Pholiota macrocystis A.H.Sm. & Hesler 1968 – United States
Pholiota mahabaleshwarensis Sathe & S.D.Deshp. 1980
Pholiota majalis Singer 1969
Pholiota malicola (Kauffman) A.H.Sm. 1934 – Tasmania
Pholiota mammillata Velen. 1921
Pholiota marangania (Grgur.) Matheny & Bougher 2010
Pholiota marginella Peck 1898
Pholiota marthae Singer 1969
Pholiota martinicensis Pat. 1903
Pholiota maximovici Velen. 1921
Pholiota megalosperma Singer 1953
Pholiota melaphila Raithelh. 1974
Pholiota melliodora A.H.Sm. & Hesler 1968 – United States
Pholiota metallica Donoso 1981
Pholiota microcarpa Singer 1969
Pholiota milleri A.H.Sm. & Hesler 1968 – United States
Pholiota mixta (Fr.) Kuyper & Tjall.-Beuk. 1986
Pholiota molesta A.H.Sm. & Hesler 1968 – United States
Pholiota mollicula Banning & Peck 1891
Pholiota molliscorium (Cooke & Massee) Sacc. 1891
Pholiota montana Singer 1965
Pholiota montevideensis Speg. 1926
Pholiota mucigera Holec & Niemelä 2000 – Finland
Pholiota mucosa Velen. 1921
Pholiota multicingulata E.Horak 1983 – Tasmania; Victoria
Pholiota muricella (Fr.) Bon 1985
Pholiota mutabilis, an alternate name for Kuehneromyces mutabilis
Pholiota myosotis Singer
Pholiota myxacioides Singer 1969

N

Pholiota nameko (T.Itô) S.Ito & S.Imai 1933
Pholiota nana E.Horak 1962
Pholiota naucorioides Singer 1955
Pholiota nguelensis Henn. 1900 – Africa
Pholiota nigripes A.H.Sm. & Hesler 1968 – United States
Pholiota nigrosetosa Velen. 1930
Pholiota novembris Singer 1969
Pholiota nymaniana (Henn.) Sacc. & P.Syd. 1902

O
Pholiota obscura A.H.Sm. & Hesler 1968 – United States
Pholiota occidentalis A.H.Sm. & Hesler 1968 – United States
Pholiota ochrochlora (Fr.) P.D.Orton 1960 – Great Britain
Pholiota ochropallida Romagn. ex Bon 1986
Pholiota ochrospora Raithelh. 1974
Pholiota odoratissima A.Blytt 1905
Pholiota olivaceocoriacea Rick 1930
Pholiota olivaceodisca A.H.Sm. & Hesler 1968 – United States
Pholiota olivaceophylla A.H.Sm. & Hesler 1968 – United States
Pholiota olympiana (A.H.Sm.) A.H.Sm. & Hesler 1968 – United States
Pholiota oregonensis (Murrill) Murrill 1912
Pholiota ornatula (Murrill) A.H.Sm. & Hesler 1968 – United States

P

Pholiota pallida A.H.Sm. & Hesler 1968 – United States
Pholiota paludosella (G.F.Atk.) A.H.Sm. & Hesler 1968 – United States
Pholiota paradoxa Naveau 1923
Pholiota parva A.Pearson 1950
Pholiota parvula W.F.Chiu 1968
Pholiota pattersoniae (Murrill) Redhead 1984
Pholiota paulensis Henn. 1908
Pholiota peleae E.Horak & Desjardin 1996 – Hawaii
Pholiota penningtoniana A.H.Sm. & Hesler 1968 – United States
Pholiota perniciosa A.H.Sm. & Hesler 1968 – United States
Pholiota phlebophora Pat. 1909
Pholiota phlegmatica (Berk.) Manjula 1983 – Sikkim
Pholiota phoenicis Sacc. 1917
Pholiota piceina (Murrill) A.H.Sm. & Hesler 1968 – United States
Pholiota pityrodes (F.Brig.) Holec 2001
Pholiota platensis Speg. 1898
Pholiota polychroa (Berk.) A.H.Sm. & H.J.Brodie 1935
Pholiota populicola A.H.Sm. & Hesler 1968 – United States
Pholiota privigna (Speg.) Singer 1961
Pholiota proba Herp. 1912 – Europe
Pholiota prolixa A.H.Sm. & Hesler 1968 – United States
Pholiota psathyrelloides Singer 1969
Pholiota pseudoblattaria Speg. 1898
Pholiota pseudoerebia A.Pearson 1950
Pholiota pseudofascicularis Speg. 1898
Pholiota pseudograveolens A.H.Sm. & Hesler 1968 – United States
Pholiota pseudohypholoma Velen. 1921
Pholiota pseudolimulata A.H.Sm. & Hesler 1968 – United States
Pholiota pseudomarginata Hruby 1930 – Europe
Pholiota pseudopulchella A.H.Sm. & Hesler 1968 – United States
Pholiota pseudosiparia A.H.Sm. & Hesler 1968 – United States
Pholiota pudica (Bull.) Gillet 1876
Pholiota pulchella A.H.Sm. & Hesler 1968 – United States
Pholiota punctata (Cleland) Grgur. 1997
Pholiota pusilla Rick 1919

R
Pholiota retiphylla G.F.Atk. 1918
Pholiota rhombifolia Herp. 1912 – Europe
Pholiota rigelliae Velen. 1921
Pholiota rigidipes Peck 1912
Pholiota rivulosa A.H.Sm. & Hesler 1968 – United States
Pholiota romagnesiana A.H.Sm. & Hesler 1968 – United States
Pholiota rosea Rick 1919
Pholiota rostrata Velen. 1921
Pholiota rubecula Banning & Peck 1891
Pholiota rubra C.S.Bi & Loh 1985 – China
Pholiota rubronigra A.H.Sm. & Hesler 1968 – United States
Pholiota rudis Rick 1961
Pholiota rufodisca A.H.Sm. & Hesler 1968 – United States

S

Pholiota sabulosa Peck 1896
Pholiota salicina Velen. 1921
Pholiota sanguineomaculans Höhn. 1914
Pholiota scabella Zeller 1933 – United States
Pholiota scamba (Fr.) M.M.Moser 1986 –  Czech Republic; Great Britain
Pholiota scamboides A.H.Sm. & Hesler 1968 – United States
Pholiota schraderi (Peck) Overh. 1924
Pholiota scobifera (Berk. & M.A.Curtis) Pat. 1903
Pholiota semi-imbricata (Singer) Singer 1951
Pholiota sequoiae A.H.Sm. & Hesler 1968 – United States
Pholiota serotina A.H.Sm. & Hesler 1968 – United States
Pholiota sienna (Kauffman) A.H.Sm. & Hesler 1968 – United States
Pholiota siennaecolor (Petch) Pegler 1986 – Sri Lanka
Pholiota silvatica (A.H.Sm.) A.H.Sm. & Hesler 1968 – United States
Pholiota simulans A.H.Sm. & Hesler 1968 – United States
Pholiota sipei A.H.Sm. & Hesler 1968 – United States
Pholiota socotrana Henn. 1891
Pholiota sola A.H.Sm. & Hesler 1968 – United States
Pholiota sordida Rick 1920
Pholiota sphaerospora Beeli 1928 – Congo
Pholiota sphagnicola (Peck) A.H.Sm. & Hesler 1968 – United States
Pholiota sphagnophila (Peck) A.H.Sm. & Hesler 1968 – United States
Pholiota spinulifera (Murrill) Singer 1973
Pholiota spumosa (Fr.) Singer 1951 – Great Britain
Pholiota squalida (Peck) A.H.Sm. & Hesler 1968 – United States
Pholiota squarrosa (Vahl) P.Kumm. 1871 – Alberta; Austria; Great Britain; Ireland; Northern Ireland
Pholiota squarrosipes Cleland 1933 – Australia
Pholiota squarrosoadiposa J.E.Lange 1940
Pholiota squarrosoides (Peck) Sacc. 1887 – Czech Republic; Great Britain; Sweden
Pholiota stratosa A.H.Sm. & Hesler 1968 – United States
Pholiota stropharioides Rick 1930
Pholiota subamara A.H.Sm. & Hesler 1968 – United States
Pholiota subcaerulea A.H.Sm. & Hesler 1968 – United States
Pholiota subcarbonaria (Murrill) A.H.Sm. & Hesler 1968 – United States
Pholiota subcastanea A.H.Sm. & Hesler 1968 – United States
Pholiota subdefossa A.H.Sm. & Hesler 1968 – United States
Pholiota suberebia (Britzelm.) Sacc. & Traverso 1911
Pholiota subflammans (Speg.) Sacc. 1891
Pholiota subflavida (Murrill) A.H.Sm. & Hesler 1968 – United States
Pholiota subfulva (Peck) A.H.Sm. & Hesler 1968 – United States
Pholiota subgelatinosa A.H.Sm. & Hesler 1968 – United States
Pholiota sublubrica A.H.Sm. & Hesler 1968 – United States
Pholiota subminor A.H.Sm. & Hesler 1968 – United States
Pholiota submutabilis Henn. 1899
Pholiota subnigra Murrill 1912
Pholiota subochracea (A.H.Sm.) A.H.Sm. & Hesler 1968 – United States – Czech Republic
Pholiota subpapillata A.H.Sm. & Hesler 1968 – United States
Pholiota subpumila Cleland 1927 – Australia
Pholiota subsaponacea A.H.Sm. & Hesler 1968 – United States
Pholiota subtestacea (Murrill) A.H.Sm. & Hesler 1968 – United States
Pholiota subtogularis Cleland 1933 – Australia
Pholiota subvelutina A.H.Sm. & Hesler 1968 – United States
Pholiota subvelutipes A.H.Sm. & Hesler 1968 – United States
Pholiota sulphurea Velen. 1921
Pholiota sylva Natarajan & C.Ravindran 2003 – India

T

Pholiota tabacinirugosa S.Ito & S.Imai 1940 – Japan
Pholiota tahquamenonensis A.H.Sm. & Hesler 1968 – United States
Pholiota talquensis Garrido 1988
Pholiota temnophylla (Peck) Sacc. 1887
Pholiota tennesseensis A.H.Sm. & Hesler 1968 – United States
Pholiota terrestris Overh. 1924 – California
Pholiota testacea Rick 1938
Pholiota tetonensis A.H.Sm. & Hesler 1968 – United States
Pholiota teucrii Bubák 1914
Pholiota tilopus (Kalchbr. & MacOwan) D.A.Reid 1975
Pholiota tottenii (Murrill) A.H.Sm. & Hesler 1968 – United States
Pholiota trinitensis Dennis 1970 – São Paulo; Trinidad-Tobago
Pholiota trullisata A.H.Sm. & Hesler 1968 – United States
Pholiota truncata Natarajan & Raman 1983 – India
Pholiota tuberculosa (Schaeff.) P.Kumm. 1871 – Czech Republic; Great Britain

U

Pholiota umbilicata A.H.Sm. & Hesler 1968 – United States
Pholiota urvilleana Sacc. 1914
Pholiota usneae Vouaux 1914

V
Pholiota variabilispora A.H.Sm. & Hesler 1968 – United States
Pholiota variicystis G.Moreno & E.Valenz. 1994
Pholiota varzeae Singer 1989
Pholiota velaglutinosa A.H.Sm. & Hesler 1968 – United States
Pholiota velata (Peck) A.H.Sm. & Hesler 1968 – United States
Pholiota veris A.H.Sm. & Hesler 1968 – United States
Pholiota verna A.H.Sm. & Hesler 1968 – United States
Pholiota verrucosa Henn. 1900 – Africa
Pholiota vialis (Murrill) A.H.Sm. & Hesler 1968 – United States
Pholiota vinaceobrunnea A.H.Sm. & Hesler 1968 – United States
Pholiota virescens E.J.Tian & T.Bau 2012
Pholiota virescentifolia A.H.Sm. & Hesler 1968 – United States
Pholiota virgata A.H.Sm. & Hesler 1968 – United States

References

Cited literature

Pholiota, List
Pholiota